Events from the year 1754 in Wales.

Incumbents
Lord Lieutenant of North Wales (Lord Lieutenant of Anglesey, Caernarvonshire, Flintshire, Merionethshire, Montgomeryshire) – George Cholmondeley, 3rd Earl of Cholmondeley 
Lord Lieutenant of Glamorgan – Charles Powlett, 3rd Duke of Bolton (until 26 August); Other Windsor, 4th Earl of Plymouth (from 6 November)
Lord Lieutenant of Brecknockshire and Lord Lieutenant of Monmouthshire – Thomas Morgan
Lord Lieutenant of Cardiganshire – Wilmot Vaughan, 3rd Viscount Lisburne
Lord Lieutenant of Carmarthenshire – vacant until 1755
Lord Lieutenant of Denbighshire – Richard Myddelton
Lord Lieutenant of Pembrokeshire – Sir William Owen, 4th Baronet
Lord Lieutenant of Radnorshire – William Perry

Bishop of Bangor – Zachary Pearce
Bishop of Llandaff – Edward Cresset
Bishop of St Asaph – Robert Hay Drummond
Bishop of St Davids – Anthony Ellys

Events
April–May - In the British general election, newly elected MPs include Robert Wynne at Caernarvon Boroughs and Benjamin Bathurst at Monmouth Boroughs.
John Jenkin (Ioan Siengcin) opens a Welsh school at Nevern.

Arts and literature

New books
Richard Rees - Collected sermons, published by Philip Charles
Ben Simon (ed.) - Collected works of Dafydd ap Gwilym
Mêr Difinyddiaeth Iachus (second edition, with a preface by Morgan Jones)

Music
William Williams (Pantycelyn) - Hosanna i Fab Dafydd, part 2

Births
28 October - John Griffiths, medical practitioner and surgeon in the Royal Household (died 1822)
25 November - William Parry, minister and author (died 1819)
date unknown - Charles Hassall, surveyor (died 1814)
 earliest likely year - Jane Cave, poet (died 1812)

Deaths
10 January - Erasmus Lewis, writer and civil servant, 83
20 February - John Owen, MP, about 52
17 May - Richard Herbert, politician, 49/50
26 August - Charles Powlett, 3rd Duke of Bolton, Lord Lieutenant of Glamorgan, 68

References

1754 by country
1754 in Great Britain